Winthrop is a city in Buchanan County, Iowa, United States. The population was 823 at the time of the 2020 census.

History
Winthrop was platted in 1857.

Geography
Winthrop is located at  (42.472419, -91.735713).

Winthrop is located north of U.S. Route 20.

Demographics

2010 census
As of the census of 2010, there were 850 people, 346 households, and 228 families living in the city. The racial makeup of the city was 98.7% White, 0.1% Native American, 0.2% Asian, 0.1% from other races, and 0.8% from two or more races. Hispanic or Latino of any race were 0.4% of the population.

There were 346 households, of which 31.8% had children under the age of 18 living with them, 52.3% were married couples living together, 9.0% had a female householder with no husband present, 4.6% had a male householder with no wife present, and 34.1% were non-families. 28.9% of all households were made up of individuals, and 14.5% had someone living alone who was 65 years of age or older. The average household size was 2.46 and the average family size was 3.00.

The median age in the city was 38.5 years. 27.5% of residents were under the age of 18; 5.7% were between the ages of 18 and 24; 24.2% were from 25 to 44; 26.7% were from 45 to 64; and 16% were 65 years of age or older. The gender makeup of the city was 50.0% male and 50.0% female.

2000 census
As of the census of 2000, there were 772 people, 327 households, and 206 families living in the city. The racial makeup of the city was 99.09% White, 0.39% Native American, 0.26% from other races, and 0.26% from two or more races. Hispanic or Latino of any race were 0.39% of the population.

There were 327 households, out of which 30.6% had children under the age of 18 living with them, 52.0% were married couples living together, 8.3% had a female householder with no husband present, and 37.0% were non-families. 33.9% of all households were made up of individuals, and 17.7% had someone living alone who was 65 years of age or older. The average household size was 2.35 and the average family size was 3.01.

25.5% were under the age of 18, 8.7% from 18 to 24, 27.5% from 25 to 44, 22.2% from 45 to 64, and 16.2% were 65 years of age or older. The median age was 38 years. For every 100 females, there were 91.1 males. For every 100 females age 18 and over, there were 84.3 males.

The median income for a household in the city was $36,136, and the median income for a family was $42,969. Males had a median income of $31,641 versus $22,500 for females. The per capita income for the city was $19,183. About 4.3% of families and 5.7% of the population were below the poverty line, including 6.3% of those under age 18 and 7.8% of those age 65 or over.

Education
Winthrop is home to the East Buchanan Community School District, which also covers the communities of Quasqueton, Aurora, and Monti. The district operates an interconnected elementary school, middle school, and high school.

Notable people
Robert S. Doran, math professor
Robert Gallery, NFL offensive guard
Michelle Monaghan, actress
Craig Quigley, US Navy admiral and Assistant Secretary of Defense

References

External links

City of Winthrop Portal style website, government, library, events, and more
City-Data Comprehensive statistical data and more about Winthrop

Cities in Buchanan County, Iowa
Cities in Iowa
1857 establishments in Iowa
Populated places established in 1857